The Delmar Loop-Parkview Gardens Historic District is a historic district in University City, Missouri and St. Louis, Missouri.  It is roughly bounded by Kingsland Ave., North Dr., Delmar Blvd., and Eastgate.  It was listed on the National Register of Historic Places in 1984.  The listing included 289 contributing buildings.

It includes two apartment subdivisions and an adjacent commercial area.

References

National Register of Historic Places in St. Louis
National Register of Historic Places in St. Louis County, Missouri
Tudor Revival architecture in the United States
Buildings and structures completed in 1911